Sphecosoma albipalpe is a moth in the subfamily Arctiinae. It was described by Max Wilhelm Karl Draudt in 1915. It is found in the Amazon region.

References

Moths described in 1915
Sphecosoma